This is a list of the number-one hits of 2008 on FIMI's Italian Download and Albums Charts.

See also
2008 in music
List of number-one hits in Italy

External links
FIMI archives
ItalianCharts.com

Number-one hits
Italy
2008